Arbelodes mondeensis is a moth in the family Metarbelidae. It is found in South Africa, where it has been recorded from the Eastern Cape. The habitat consists of thickets and tree clumps.

The length of the forewings is about 8.5 mm. The forewings are glossy light yellowish-olive with a brown terminal band edged by a wave-like line of ivory yellow. The hindwings are light yellowish-olive with a brown band at the outer half of the wing.

Etymology
The species name refers to Kleinemonde, the type locality.

References

Natural History Museum Lepidoptera generic names catalog

Endemic moths of South Africa
Moths described in 2010
Metarbelinae